Sargis Karapetyan (Armenian: Սարգիս Կարապետյան; born 24 April 1990) is an Armenian professional midfielder who last played for CSKA Pamir Dushanbe.

Career

Club
In March 2017, Karapetyan was registered by Tajikistan Higher League side CSKA Pamir Dushanbe for their upcoming season.

Career statistics

International

Statistics accurate as of match played 11 February 2009

References

External links
 Profile at ffa.am
 

1990 births
Living people
Armenian footballers
Armenia international footballers
FC Urartu players
Footballers from Yerevan
Armenian Premier League players
Association football midfielders
Tajikistan Higher League players